Unterer Hauenstein Pass (el. 691 m.) is a mountain pass in the Jura Mountains between the canton of Basel-Country and Solothurn in Switzerland.

It connects Buckten in Basel-Country and Trimbach in Solothurn. The pass road has a maximum grade of 6 percent.

The pass was probably already used by the Romans. In 1993, Roman artifacts were discovered at the pass. It also lies close to the Roman settlement of Augusta Raurica.

Hauenstein, Unterer
Hauenstein, Unterer
Mountain passes of the canton of Solothurn
Mountain passes of Basel-Landschaft
Basel-Landschaft–Solothurn border